Luis Santiago may refer to:

 Luis Santiago (1977–2005), a Filipino TV director
 Luis Carlos Santiago (1989–2010), a Mexican journalist
 Luis Carlos Santiago Zabaleta (born 1946), a Spanish basketball player